Qīngmíng, Seimei, Cheongmyeong or Thanh minh, is the name of the 5th solar term of the traditional Chinese lunisolar calendar, which divides a year into 24 solar terms ( 節氣/ 节气). In space partitioning, Qingming begins when the sun reaches the celestial longitude of 15° and ends when it reaches the longitude of 30°. It more often refers in particular to the day when the sun is exactly at the celestial longitude of 15°, usually on April 5.

Compared to the space partitioning theory, in the time division theory Qingming falls around April 7 or approximately 106.5 days after winter equinox. In the Gregorian calendar, it usually begins around 4 or 5 April and ends around 20 April.

Pentads
Each solar term can be divided into 3 pentads (候). They are: first pentad (初候), second pentad (次候) and last pentad (末候). Pentads in Qingming include:

 China
 First pentad: 桐始華/桐始华, 'The paulownia begins to bloom'.
 Second pentad: 田鼠化為鴽/田鼠化为鴽, 'Voles(you) transform into quails'.
 Last pentad: 虹始見/虹始见, 'Rainbows begin to appear'.

 Japan
 First pentad: , 'The swallow flies back from the south'.
 Second pentad: , 'The goose migrates to the north'.
 Last pentad: , 'Rainbows begin to appear in the sky after shower'.

Date and time

References

See also 
 East Asian cultural sphere
 Qingming Festival (清明節/清明节), festival celebrated on the day of Qīngmíng
 Cold Food Festival (寒食節/寒食节), three-day festival starting one day before and ending one day after Qīngmíng
 Along the River During the Qingming Festival

05
Spring (season)